Mount Salem Baptist Meetinghouse, also known as Mount Salem Baptist Church, is a historic Baptist meeting house located near Washington, Rappahannock County, Virginia. It was built in 1850–1851, and is a one-story, stuccoed stone building. It measures 40 feet by 50 feet and is topped by a gable roof. The church was restored and put into active service in 1977, after closure in 1942.

It was added to the National Register of Historic Places in 1979.

References

Baptist churches in Virginia
Washington, Virginia
Buildings and structures in Rappahannock County, Virginia
Churches completed in 1851
Churches on the National Register of Historic Places in Virginia
National Register of Historic Places in Rappahannock County, Virginia
1851 establishments in Virginia
19th-century Baptist churches in the United States